Promise at Dawn is a 1970 American drama film directed by Jules Dassin and starring Melina Mercouri, Dassin's wife. It is based on the 1960 novel Promise at Dawn by Romain Gary and the subsequent play by Samuel A. Taylor.

Plot
The film follows author Romain Gary as he recalls his growing up with his Lithuanian-born mother. The two leave Vilnius, Lithuania for France, where they settle in Paris. As twenty years pass, they encounter social change, age, different convictions, poverty and the slow approach of World War II.

Cast
 Melina Mercouri as Nina Kacew
 Assi Dayan as Romain age 25
 Didier Haudepin as Romain age 15
 François Raffoul as Romain age 9
 Despo Diamantidou as Aniela (as Despo)
 Jean Martin as Igor Igorevitch
 Fernand Gravey as Jean-Michel Serusier
 Jacqueline Porel as Madame Mailer
 Elspeth March as Fat Woman
 Maria Machado as Nathalie Lissenko
 Julie Dassin as Romain's Friend
 René Clermont as Mr. Piekielny
 Carole Cole as Louison
 Marina Nestora as Mariette
 Audrey Berindey as Valentine Mailer
 Jacqueline Duc as Madame de Rare
 Muni as Angélique
 Thérèse Thoreaux as Silent Film Heroine
 Jules Dassin as Ivan Mosjukine
 Dennis Berry as Belle Gueule
 Rufus as The Violin Teacher
 Katia Tchenko as The actress

Production
The film was shot in Nice, Paris and the USSR. Dassin broke both his legs after falling over in October 1969 after three days of filming in Nice.

Avco Embassy president Joseph E. Levine filmed a cameo for the film.

References

External links

1970 films
1970 drama films
American drama films
Films scored by Georges Delerue
Films based on works by Romain Gary
Films based on French novels
Films directed by Jules Dassin
Embassy Pictures films
1970s English-language films
1970s American films